Richard Ronald Burns (January 29, 1874 – June 14, 1950) was a Canadian politician. He served in the Legislative Assembly of British Columbia from 1933 to 1941  from the electoral district of Rossland-Trail, a member of the Liberal party.

References

1874 births
1950 deaths
British emigrants to Canada